Adrián Roncallo (born 24 August 1958) is an Argentine alpine skier. He competed in two events at the 1976 Winter Olympics.

References

1958 births
Living people
Argentine male alpine skiers
Olympic alpine skiers of Argentina
Alpine skiers at the 1976 Winter Olympics
Place of birth missing (living people)